"Fais ce que tu voudras" (meaning "Do Whatever You Want") is a song written by Quebec's composer René Grignon and French lyricist Eddy Marnay. It is the first and only single from Celine Dion's greatest hits album Les chansons en or. It was released on 2 June 1986 in Quebec, Canada.

Background
On 14 June 1986 this melancholic ballad entered the Quebec Singles Chart and peaked at number 36, spending twelve weeks on the chart.

The B-side included "Tu es là", which was taken from the album C'est pour toi.

Dion filmed her first real French-language music video for this single in 1986. It was directed by François Girard and featured Dion at a train station. This music video can be found on the DVD called On ne change pas (2005). It was Dion's second music video after her first English-language song "Listen to the Magic Man".

The title alludes to the proverb coined by French Renaissance writer François Rabelais, which has later become a main tenet of the modern-day thelemic occult movement in the English version by Aleister Crowley: "Do what thou wilt".

Track listings and formats
Canadian 7" single
"Fais ce que tu voudras" – 3:42
"Tu es là" – 2:43

Charts

References

1986 singles
1986 songs
Celine Dion songs
French-language songs
Pop ballads
Song recordings produced by Eddy Marnay
Songs written by Eddy Marnay